Siopa is a genus of picture-winged flies in the family Ulidiidae.

Species
 S. longicornis

References

 
Ulidiidae